Andreas Seppi was the defending champion. Seppi defended his title, defeating Matthias Bachinger in the final, 6–4, 6–3.

Seeds

Draw

Finals

Top half

Bottom half

References
 Main Draw
 Qualifying Draw

Sparkassen ATP Challenger - Singles
2014 Singles